A dog licence is required in some jurisdictions to be the keeper of a dog. Usually a dog-licence identifying number is issued to the owner, along with a dog tag bearing the identifier and a contact number for the registering organization. If a stray pet is found with the tag, a rescuer can call the registering organization to get current contact information for the animal.

Licensing a dog might require additional actions on the owner's part, such as ensuring that the dog has a current rabies vaccination or passing a dog obedience test. In many jurisdictions a fee, which is usually small, must be paid. Licences typically must be renewed annually or after some small number of years.

Licensing information worldwide

Germany
Most municipalities raise a tax for dogs which is paid on a yearly basis. In some municipalities subsequent dogs are taxed higher to discourage owning too many.

India
Contrary to other countries like the US, Italy, New Zealand, Spain, Ireland etc., India does not have any pan-India law for dog-licence, but pet owners can get their dogs registered with the local municipal authorities based on their city and state. One can also register their dog with the Kennel Club of India (KCI). The KCI provides registration for all pet dogs in India.

The current lifestyle has forced people to live in densely populated cities and apartments with limited space for dogs to enjoy and play freely. Incidents of animal abuse and dog bites have made it difficult for dog owners to convince resident welfare associations to permit them to live with their dogs.

Since 14 January 2023 the government of India made a decision that is mandatory for every dog owner to pay the dog tax . These taxes are collected by municipality of that area.

Australia
Dog licences are mandated by state and territory legislation but are issued by local governments (e.g., city or shire councils). Hence the cost of a licence and the format of the licence tag vary across the country. Some areas, such as Victoria, require cat registration and microchipping also.

Ireland
Dog licences are required. There are three types of licence:
 Individual dog licence –  covers one dog for a period of 12 months
 General dog licence –  for owners of kennels for a period of 12 months
 Lifetime of the dog licence –  for the lifetime of the dog for which the licence is issued

Italy
Since 2008 an identification microchip is mandatory for each dog over 2 months, and a small fee is associated with it, but it does not need to be renewed.

Netherlands
Dogs must be registered and a yearly tax is paid to the municipality based on the number of dogs. The amount differs between municipalities; for example in The Hague it is €125.76 for the first dog, €322.80 for the second one, and €572.64 for the third one (in 2021). Any additional dog costs 249.84 (in 2021). Other municipalities, such as Amsterdam, have abolished this tax.

New Zealand
Under the Dog Control Act 1996 all dogs over three months old are required to be registered with the city or district council the dog usually resides in. As a prerequisite, all dogs classified as dangerous or menacing, and all dogs first registered in New Zealand after 1 July 2006 must be microchipped before they can be registered.

All dog registrations expire yearly on 30 June, and must be renewed by 31 July. Each registered dog must wear a tag specifying the council, registration expiry date, and registration number of the dog, with the colour of the tag changing every year for easy identification (e.g. tags for the 2013–14 year are red). Fees for registration differ between councils, and also differ according to factors such as whether the dog is neutered, living in an urban or rural area, classed as dangerous or menacing, and whether the owner is a responsible dog owner. Fees for working dogs (herding dogs, police dogs, drug dogs, etc.) are generally lower than for pets, and seeing-eye or hearing-ear dogs are generally free or minimal cost to register.

United Kingdom
In England, Wales and Scotland, dog licensing was abolished by the Local Government Act 1988. Prior to this dog licences were mandatory under the Dog Licences Act 1959, having been originally introduced by the Dog Licences Act 1867, but the requirement was widely ignored, with only about half of owners having one. The final rate for a dog licence was 37 pence, reduced from p when the halfpenny was withdrawn in 1984. This figure was an exact conversion from the rate of seven shillings and sixpence set in the Customs and Inland Revenue Act 1878. The revenue went to local authorities.  The term has found its way in golf, where a 7 and 6 win in golf is referred as a "dog licence" owing to the historical cost as set in 1878.

Dog licensing was in effect a tax on dogs: the scheme did not ensure the welfare of dogs nor did it restrict who was allowed to keep dogs.

In 2016 it became a requirement that all dogs in England and Wales have a microchip; Scottish legislation was also changed to make microchipping of dogs compulsory from 2016.

In Northern Ireland, dog licences are required under the Dogs (Northern Ireland) Order 1983.  dog licences cost £12.50 a year, with reductions for pensioners and owners of neutered dogs.

Crown dependencies

Bailiwick of Guernsey
Dog owners in Guernsey are required to pay dog tax each year for each dog owned.

Isle of Man
Dog licences were abolished on 1 April 2018.

United States
At least some states, municipalities, and other jurisdictions require a dog licence  and rabies vaccination, and a licence expires before the vaccine does. To prevent animal overpopulation, some jurisdictions charge a lower licensing fee if the owner presents veterinary proof that the dog has been spayed or neutered. Some parts of California and Maryland require cat licences.

An effort was made in 2012 to repeal the requirement for dog licenses in the state of New Hampshire. The effort did not succeed at the time due in part to testimony provided by the son of the chair of the committee who was a veterinarian testifying against the bill. Funds from the tax for dog licenses go towards the state veterinarian.

References

Dog law